Lophostemon lactifluus, commonly known as swamp mahogany or  milky box, is a tree or shrub of the family Myrtaceae native to northern Australia.

References

Myrtaceae
Myrtales of Australia
Plants described in 1859
Taxa named by Ferdinand von Mueller